Sachanand is a Pakistani politician who was elected member for the Provincial Assembly of Sindh.

Political career
He was elected to Provincial Assembly of Sindh on a reserved seat for minorities in 2018 Pakistani general election representing Pakistan Tehreek-e-Insaf

References

Living people
Pakistan Tehreek-e-Insaf MPAs (Sindh)
Politicians from Sindh
Year of birth missing (living people)